Ventanas Canton is a canton of Ecuador, located in the Los Ríos Province.  Its capital is the town of Ventanas.  Its population at the 2001 census was 71,145.

Governance

The Ventanas canton, like the other Ecuadorian cantons, is governed by a municipal government as stipulated in the National Political Constitution.  The Municipal Government of Ventanas is a sectional government entity that administers the canton autonomously from the central government.

Populations figures

According to INEC projections for 2022, the canton has a population of 76,104 inhabitants, making it the fourth most populous canton at the provincial level.  Ethnic groups as of the Ecuadorian census of 2010:
Ethnic groups as of the Ecuadorian census of 2010:
Mestizo  55.5%
Montubio  33.8%
Afro-Ecuadorian  5.8%
White  3.7%
Indigenous  1.0%
Other  0.3%

Political divisions
The canton is divided into 5 parishes, classified as either urban or rural. The canton has more parishes than any other canton in Ecuador. The urban parishes make up the city of Ventanas. 

Rural parishes
Chacarita
Los Ángeles 
ZapotalUrban parishes'''
10 de Noviembre
Ventanas

References

Cantons of Los Ríos Province